Adelius determinatus is a hymenopteran parasitoid in the family Braconidae. It occurs in central Europe.

Hosts
Ectoedemia argyropeza (on Populus nigra)

References

Braconidae
Parasitic wasps 
Insects described in 1851